Volume II is the second album of Kamchatka, an 11-track album containing 1 cover: "Enemy Maker" originally written by Alan Haggerty. The album was recorded by Tobias Strandvik and Kamchatka, mixed by Nicholas Elgstrand and Kamchatka and mastered by Tobias Strandvik and Kamchatka at Shrimpmonkey studios.

Track listing
  "Who Am I?" (Andersson, Öjersson)
  "Breathe" (Öjersson)
  "Terminus" (Öjersson)
  "Withstand" (Andersson, Öjersson)
  "From Here" (Andersson)
  "Enemy Maker" (Dub War/Alan Haggerty)
  "Heritage" (Öjersson)
  "Sweet Relief" (Öjersson)
  "Pogonophonics" (Öjersson, Andersson, Strandvik)
  "Feel" (Andersson)
  "Jigsaw" (Öjersson)(includes bonus track)

Credits

Band
Thomas "Juneor" Andersson - guitar & lead vocals
Roger Öjersson - bass & lead vocals
Tobias Strandvik - drums

Personnel
Nicholas Elgstrand - producer
Joe Romagnola - executive producer
Jennelie Andersson - band photos
Hippograffix - cover art layout & design (also Armageddon - Three amongst others)

External links
 

2007 albums
Kamchatka (band) albums